Nicolas "Cole" Turner (born March 16, 2000) is an American football tight end for the Washington Commanders of the National Football League (NFL). He played college football at Nevada as a wide receiver before switching to tight end as a senior and was selected by the Commanders in the fifth round of the 2022 NFL Draft.

High school and college
Turner was born on March 16, 2000, in Clackamas, Oregon. He attended Clackamas High School, where he was a two-sport athlete in football and basketball. He helped lead his football team to three consecutive conference titles and a state championship in 2017. He led the state of Oregon in receiving as a senior in 2017 with 76 receptions for 1,325 yards and 20 touchdowns, earning him all-state honors.

Turner enrolled at the University of Nevada, Reno in 2018 and appeared in 12 games as a freshman for the Nevada Wolf Pack football team as a wide receiver. He transitioned to tight end as a sophomore in 2020, where he was given first-team All-Mountain West honors after recording nine touchdown catches and finishing second on the team in catches (49) and receiving yards (605) behind Romeo Doubs. As a senior in 2021, he was named to the All-Mountain West second-team after making 10 touchdown catches, which was tied for second in the nation among tight ends behind Georgia's Brock Bowers. He played in the 2022 Senior Bowl.

Professional career

Turner was drafted by the Washington Commanders in the fifth round (149th overall) of the 2021 NFL Draft and signed his four-year rookie contract on May 6, 2022.

Personal life
Turner's given name is Nicolas but has preferred going by Cole since childhood.

References

External links
 
 Washington Commanders bio
 Nevada Wolf Pack bio

2000 births
Living people
American football tight ends
American men's basketball players
Nevada Wolf Pack football players
People from Clackamas, Oregon
Players of American football from Oregon
Sportspeople from the Portland metropolitan area
Washington Commanders players